Edgerly is a surname (and, less commonly, a given name). The name may refer to:

People

Surname 

 Chris Edgerly (born 1969), American voice actor, comedian and singer
 Clara Power Edgerly (died 1897), prominent elocutionist and principal of the Boston College of Oratory
 Edward Edgerly, American politician
 Webster Edgerly (1852–1926), American social reform activist
 Winfield Scott Edgerly (1846–1927), United States Army officer

Given name or middle name 
 Gladys Edgerly Bates (1896–2003), American sculptor
 Peter Edgerly Firchow (1937–2008), American literary scholar and educator
 Dan Zanes (born 1961; Daniel Edgerly Zanes), American musician
 Hibiscus (1949–1982; born George Edgerly Harris III); American founder of the Cockettes

See also 
 Edgerley (disambiguation)